Walter May may refer to:
 Walter G. May, American engineer
 Walter Barton May, English industrialist
 Walt May, American football player